Twist is a 2003 Canadian drama film directed by Jacob Tierney and starring Nick Stahl and Joshua Close. It is a retelling of Charles Dickens' classic 1838 novel Oliver Twist.

Plot
The plot of Oliver Twist is updated to the present day, and moved out of the London poor house onto the streets of a large North American city (in Donsky's film it was New York City, and this film it is Toronto). In addition, the tale is told not from Oliver's point of view, but rather that of Dodge (Nick Stahl). Oliver (Joshua Close) falls into the hands of down-and-out young men. Dodge takes Oliver under his wing and instructs him in the unforgiving arts of drug abuse and prostitution. Oliver develops a crush on Dodge and views him as his boyfriend, complicating their friendship. Dodge does not reciprocate his feelings, and reacts angrily to Oliver's kisses and other signs of affection. As Oliver's innocence dissolves, both young men confront their demons, and ultimately it is Dodge who finds he cannot escape his past. Dodge is found by his brother around the same time the young men's caretaker commits suicide, sending Dodge into a violent rage at the film's conclusion.

Cast
 Nick Stahl as Jimmy/Dodge
 Joshua Close as Oliver
 Gary Farmer as Fagin
 Michèle-Barbara Pelletier as Nancy
 Tygh Runyan as David
 Stephen McHattie as Benjamin/The Senator
 Moti Yona as Charley
 Brigid Tierney as Betsy
 Andre Noble as Adam
 Maxwell McCabe-Lokos as Noah
 Josh Holliday as Morris
 Dave Graham as Buck
 Mike Lobel as Bully

Reception
Twist currently holds a 16% 'Rotten' rating on Rotten Tomatoes, with the consensus "Despite of [sic] its contemporary setting and some strong performances, this is a bland retelling of Oliver Twist."

See also
 Oliver Twist
 Twisted, a 1997 Seth Michael Donsky similarly conceived film
 Sugar, a 2004 film with a similar plot

References

External links
 
 
 
 

Films based on Oliver Twist
2003 films
2003 drama films
Canadian independent films
Canadian LGBT-related films
English-language Canadian films
Canadian coming-of-age drama films
Films about drugs
Films about orphans
Films set in Toronto
Films shot in Toronto
Incest in film
Films about male prostitution in the United States
LGBT-related drama films
2003 LGBT-related films
LGBT-related coming-of-age films
Films directed by Jacob Tierney
2000s coming-of-age films
2000s English-language films
2000s Canadian films